Sivan is a month of the Hebrew calendar.

Sivan may also refer to:

 Shiva or Shivan or Sivan (Hindu deity) or Siva, name of a Hindu god
 Indian given name derived from name of the god Shiva

People

Given name

Sivan
 Sivan Fahima (born 1983), Israeli footballer 
 Sivan Klein (born 1984), Israeli beauty queen
 Sivan Levy (born 1987), Israeli singer-songwriter, filmmaker, and actress
 Sivan Malkin Maas, first Israeli to be ordained as a rabbi in Humanistic Judaism
 Sivan Rahav-Meir (born 1981), Israeli journalist, news reporter, and TV and radio anchor

Şivan
 Şivan Perwer (born 1955), Kurdish poet, writer, musical teacher, singer, and performer on the Bağlama in Turkey

Surname
 Daniel Sivan (born 1949), Israeli professor of Hebrew language
 Eyal Sivan, Israeli documentary filmmaker, theoretician and scholar
 Meskie Shibru-Sivan (born 1967), Israeli actress and vocalist
 Ori Sivan (born 1963), Israeli film and television director and screenwriter
 Troye Sivan (born 1995), South African–born Australian singer-songwriter, actor and YouTuber
 Uri Sivan (born 1955), Israeli physicist, President of the Technion – Israel Institute of Technology

Indian name
In Indian names, the name Sivan some times used as patronymic, not a family name, and the person will be referred to by the given name.
 Kailasavadivoo Sivan (born 1957), chairman of the Indian Space Research Organisation
 Neelakanta Sivan (1839–1900), Indian composer of Carnatic music
 Papanasam Sivan (1890–1973), Indian composer of Carnatic music and a singer
 Sangeeth Sivan, Indian film director and screenwriter who works in Malayalam and Hindi cinemas
 Santosh Sivan (born 1964), Indian cinematographer, film director, producer and actor known for his works in Malayalam, Tamil and Hindi cinema

Places
 Sivan, Iran (disambiguation)

Arts and entertainment
 Sivan (film), a 1999 Tamil-language film

Business and economy
 Sivan design group